W.N. Seay House is a historic home located at Buena Vista, Virginia. It was built in 1889, and is a two-story, weatherboarded balloon-frame Late Victorian style dwelling.  It features a highly decorated, one-story, three-bay porch with turned, bracketed posts and jig-sawn balustrade.  Also on the property is a garage/utility building (c. 1900) with board-and-batten siding.  It was built by William Nelson Seay (1850-1939) who helped found Buena Vista.

It was listed on the National Register of Historic Places in 2007.

References

Houses on the National Register of Historic Places in Virginia
Houses completed in 1889
Houses in Buena Vista, Virginia
National Register of Historic Places in Buena Vista, Virginia